Cycles is the second album by cellist David Darling, recorded in 1981 and released on the ECM label.

Reception
The Allmusic review by Scott Yanow awarded the album 4 stars stating "Darling and his sidemen give the music a wide variety of sounds. However, the sleepy mood is very much in the stereotypical ECM mold, making this set mostly of interest for selected tastes".

Track listing
All compositions by David Darling except as indicated.

 "Cycle Song" - 7:09 
 "Cycle One: Namaste" (Darling, Jan Garbarek, Collin Walcott) - 4:11 
 "Fly" - 9:25 
 "Ode" - 6:55 
 "Cycle Two: Trio" (Darling, Steve Kuhn, Walcott) - 5:30 
 "Cycle Three: Quintet and Coda" (Arild Andersen, Oscar Castro-Neves, Darling, Kuhn, Walcott) - 7:52 
 "Jessica's Sunwheel" (Castro-Neves, Darling) - 5:21

Personnel
David Darling - cello, 8-string electric cello
Collin Walcott - sitar (1,4,7), tabla (2,5,6), percussion (2)
Steve Kuhn - piano (1,3,5,6,7)
Jan Garbarek - tenor saxophone (3,4,7), soprano saxophone (2)
Arild Andersen - bass (1,3,4,6,7)
Oscar Castro-Neves - guitar (2,4,6,7)

References

ECM Records albums
David Darling (musician) albums
Albums produced by Manfred Eicher
1982 albums